Cho Sang-woo (born September 4, 1994) is a South Korean professional baseball pitcher currently playing for the Kiwoom Heroes of the KBO League.

Cho Sang-woo, along with Park Dong-won in 2018, has been unable to play since June, being tied to a sexual assault case. No charges were filed.

References

External links
Career statistics and player information from Korea Baseball Organization

Cho Sang-woo at Nexen Heroes Baseball Club

Kiwoom Heroes players
KBO League pitchers
South Korean baseball players
2015 WBSC Premier12 players
Baseball players at the 2020 Summer Olympics
People from Uijeongbu
1994 births
Living people
Olympic baseball players of South Korea
Sportspeople from Gyeonggi Province